Edvaldo Teles Alves (born 10 March 1966), commonly known as Edvaldo, is a retired Brazilian footballer. He died 29 March 2015

Career statistics

Club

Notes

Referenceshttps://www.sport24.gr/football/efyge-o-entvalnto.8291145.html

1966 births
Living people
Brazilian footballers
Brazilian expatriate footballers
Association football forwards
Esporte Clube Vitória players
FC Porto players
Olympiacos F.C. players
S.C. Freamunde players
Fluminense FC players
São José Esporte Clube players
Brazilian expatriate sportspeople in Portugal
Expatriate footballers in Portugal
Brazilian expatriate sportspeople in Greece
Expatriate footballers in Greece